Inflame is a 2017 Turkish psychological thriller film directed by Ceylan Özgün Özçelik. It was screened in the Panorama section at the 67th Berlin International Film Festival.

Cast
 Algı Eke as Hasret
 Özgür Çevik as Mehmet

References

External links
 

2017 films
2017 directorial debut films
2017 drama films
2010s psychological drama films
Turkish drama films
2010s Turkish-language films